Chrysoritis irene, the Irene's opal, is a species of butterfly in the family Lycaenidae. It is endemic to South Africa, where it is found in fynbos on the Du Toit's Kloof mountains and Rivieronderendberge in the Western Cape.

The wingspan is 30–32 mm for males and 32–34 mm for females. Adults are on wing from October to April, with peaks in November and March. There are multiple generations per year.

The larvae probably feed on Dimorphotheca species.

References

Chrysoritis
Butterflies described in 1968
Endemic butterflies of South Africa
Taxonomy articles created by Polbot